Sodium triethylborohydride is an organoboron compound with the formula NaBH(C2H5)3.  It is a colorless, pyrophoric solid that is commercially available in toluene solution, unlike the related LiBH(C2H5)3 which is typically sold as a THF solution. It is commonly used for the reductive activation of homogeneous catalysts, converting metal halides to hydrides.  Sodium triethylborohydride has been prepared by treating a hot toluene slurry of sodium hydride with triethylborane. The trimethylborohydride analogue, which is assumed to be structurally similar to the triethylborohydride, adopts a tetrameric structure in toluene solution.

References

Sodium compounds
Borohydrides
Organoboranes
Reducing agents